St. Berchmans Higher Secondary School  is an aided school in the Kottayam district and it is one of the oldest Christian schools in Kerala. The Archdiocese of Changanassery runs the school, which serves Grades 5 through 12.

History 
The boys' school was founded in 1891 by the French Jesuit Charles Lavigne, the first bishop of Changanacherry, as a residential (boarding) school. Until 1997, students were admitted to Grades 5 through 10. In the 1998-99 school year, the school expanded to include Grades 11 and 12. Now the school's higher secondary studies include four science batches and two commerce batches. Built on a 10-acre campus with more than 3,000 students, St. Berchmans is one of the larges schools in Changanacherry. The school is part of the corporate management of schools in the Archdiocese of Changanassery.

Administration

Facilities

Library 
The school's library has more than 20,000 books and journals.

Career guidance cell 
The career guidance cell of the school gives information to the students on education and career opportunities. Currently, St. Berchmans is the Kottayam district nodal center of student career and counseling.

Orientation program 
All students attend an orientation program at the beginning of the academic year.  Different batches of 100 students attend two-day seminars of various activities for the students to get to know one another and realize their potential. Parents also attend sessions.

Boarding house 
St. Berchmans was founded as a residential school and continues to operate a boarding house for students whose families live far away.

References 

Schools in Kerala
Catholic schools in India
Syro-Malabar Catholic Church
Educational institutions established in 1891
1891 establishments in India